The year 1983 was the 12th year after the independence of Bangladesh. It was also the second year of the Government of Hussain Muhammad Ershad.

Incumbents

 President: A. F. M. Ahsanuddin Chowdhury (until 10 December), Hussain Muhammad Ershad (starting 11 December)
 Chief Justice: F.K.M. Munim

Demography

Climate

Economy

Note: For the year 1983 average official exchange rate for BDT was 24.62 per US$.

Events

 14 February - At least 10 people, mostly students, were killed when police opened fire on the procession against the education policy, popularly known at that time as “Majid Khan Education Policy.” The incident marked the beginning of the anti-autocracy movement against the military regime of H. M. Ershad.
 18 February - Over 2,000 people, mostly Muslims of Bangladeshi origin, are massacred in Assam, India, during the Assam agitation.
 20 September - The Bangladesh National Museum (Jatiya Jadughar) ordinance came into effect.
 2 October - Grameen Bank was established through a government ordinance.
 11 December - Hussain Muhammad Ershad takes charge as the President of Bangladesh.

Awards and recognitions

Bangladeshi author Abdullah-Al-Muti won the UNESCO Kalinga Prize.

Independence Day Award

Ekushey Padak
 Shawkat Osman (literature)
 Sanaul Huq (literature)
 Abdul Gaffar Chowdhury (literature)
 M A Kuddus (education)
 Shahidullah Kaisar (journalism)
 Syed Nur Uddin (journalism)
 Abu Jafar Shamsuddin (literature)
 Mohammad Kibria (painting)
 Barin Mazumder (music)
 Muhammad Mansuruddin

Sports
 Domestic football:
 Abahani KC won Dhaka League title while Mohammedan SC became runner-up.
 Mohammedan SC won the title of Bangladesh Federation Cup.

Births
 11 April – Munem Wasif, photographer
 28 May – Mamnun Hasan Emon, actor

Deaths
 26 January – Selina Banu, freedom fighter and social activist (b. 1926)
 12 February – Benajir Ahmed, author (b. 1903)
 4 May – Abul Fazal, author (b. 1903)
 28 August – MA Wadud, language activist (b. 1925)
 22 October – Khondakar Abdul Hamid, journalist (b. 1918)
 10 November – Manabendra Narayan Larma, human rights activist (b. 1939)
 28 August – MA Wadud, language activist (b. 1925)
 31 December – Mohammad Sultan, language activist (b. 1926)

See also 
 1980s in Bangladesh
 Timeline of Bangladeshi history

References